Calyptra eustrigata is a moth of the  family Erebidae, found in Sri Lanka and Malaysia. It has been reported as exhibiting parasitic blood-sucking behavior.

References

Calpinae
Moths described in 1926